The Stadtkirche Glarus is the main Reformed church for the city of Glarus in the canton of Glarus in Switzerland.

External links
 

Churches in the canton of Glarus
Glarus
Tourist attractions in the canton of Glarus
Glarus Stadtkirche